Leylan is a city in East Azerbaijan Province, Iran.

Leylan may also refer to various places in Iran:
 Leylan, Hamadan
 Leylan, alternate name of Lilas, Hamadan Province
 Leylan, Markazi
 Leylan, Zanjan
 Leylan District, in East Azerbaijan Province
 Leylan-e Jonubi Rural District, in East Azerbaijan Province
 Leylan-e Shomali Rural District, in East Azerbaijan Province